Assorted Motion Pictures is a production house based in Mumbai, India. The house was founded by Aritra Das, Sarbani Mukherjee and Ram Kamal Mukherjee in 2015.

Operations
The production house is based in Mumbai and has produced a range of short films. It has produced successful film like Rickshawala, Cakewalk, Broken Frame, Seasons Greeting, Shubho Bijoya and upcoming film is The Inside Job.

Filmography

References 

Film production companies based in Mumbai
Entertainment companies of India
Indian companies established in 2015
2015 establishments in Maharashtra